Jens Peter Blauert (born 20 June 1938 in Hamburg) is a German scientist specializing in psychoacoustics and an emeritus professor at the Ruhr-Universität Bochum, where he founded the Institute of Communication Acoustics. His major scientific fields of interest are spatial hearing, binaural technology, aural architecture, perceptual quality, speech technology, virtual environments and tele-presence.

Biography
Blauert was born in Hamburg on June 20, 1938 to Werner, a university lecturer and Hedwig. He received his elementary and secondary education in Dresden and Hamburg and later received a doctorate in engineering after studying communication engineering in Aachen in 1969. Since 1974 he has been an important figure in electrical engineering and acoustics at the Ruhr-Universität Bochum, where he established the Institute of Communication Acoustics (IKA) and chaired it until 2003. After this he was honored as an emeritus professor.

Blauert is a fellow of the Acoustical Society of America, the Institute of Electrical and Electronics Engineers, the Institute of Acoustics, and the Audio Engineering Society. Further, he is honorary member of the German audiological society, and the Polish Acoustical Society. During his career he has authored or co-authored over 150 papers and has published books such as Spatial Hearing - the Psychophysics of Human Sound Localization (1983), a standard in this field.

He has provided his professional expertise to the science community in several countries and has been asked to lecture at many universities worldwide, including Cardiff University. He served as chairman of the ITG committee on electroacoustics, cofounder and chairman of the European Acoustics Association, president and vice president of the German Acoustical Society, an associate board member of the International Commission for Acoustics, member of the Environmental-Protection Council of the State of North Rhine-Westphalia, board member and cofounder of the European Speech-Communication Association, and board member and cofounder of the section on noise and vibration, of the German Standard Association.

In 1994 he was awarded an honorary degree (Dr. Tech.) by Aalborg University, Denmark and has received various other honors and awards. In 1999, he was bestowed with the Helmholtz-Rayleigh Interdisciplinary Silver Medal of the Acoustical Society of America. In 2009 he co-authored the book Acoustics for Engineers: Troy Lectures with Ning Xiang.

References

Further reading 
 Räumliches Hören. S. Hirzel-Verlag, Stuttgart 1974, 
1. Nachschrift. Neue Ergebnisse und Trends seit 1972. 1985, 
2. Nachschrift. Neue Ergebnisse und Trends seit 1982. 1997, 
 . The MIT Press, USA-Cambridge MA
1. Auflage, 1983, 
Revised Edition, 1996, 
 . In: Robert H. Gilkey, Timothy R. Anderson (Hrsg.): . Lawrence Erlbaum, USA-Mahwah NJ 1996, S. 593-609, 
 (Hrsg.): . Springer, Berlin/Heidelberg/New York 2005, 
 (Ed.): . Springer, Berlin/Heidelberg/New York/Dordrecht/London 2013, 

1938 births
Scientists from Hamburg
Acousticians
Living people
Fellows of the Acoustical Society of America
Fellow Members of the IEEE
Speech processing researchers